The 1905 FA Cup final was contested by Aston Villa and Newcastle United at Crystal Palace. Aston Villa were victorious, winning 2–0, with Harry Hampton scoring both goals.

Match details

References

1905
1904–05 in English football
Aston Villa F.C. matches
Newcastle United F.C. matches
April 1905 sports events
1905 sports events in London